Cerdd dafod (literally tongue craft) is the Welsh tradition of creating verse or poetry to a strict metre in the Welsh language.

History
The history of cerdd dafod can be traced to 6th century Welsh poets such as Aneirin and Taliesin, but is probably much older. Studies also suggest that features of this form of poetry are comparable to the ancient Irish versifications and therefore point to an older shared Celtic inheritance. The composition of cerdd dafod requires strict observance of the rules of cynghanedd: an intricate system of sound-arrangement in respect of stress, alliteration, and internal rhyme within each line.

One of the earliest texts on the subject is credited to Einion Offeiriad (fl c. 1320–c. 1349) a bard considered to have been under the patronage of Sir Rhys ap Gruffydd, a powerful nobleman of south-west Wales. In it, he lists 24 canonical metres used for all poems in the writing of cerdd dafod. This was later revised by Dafydd ap Edmwnd who, in an eisteddfod held at Carmarthen circa 1450, changed two of the Offeiriad's metres to two more complicated versions of his own. These changes were adopted by future competitions as the preferred canon.

In 1925 the Celtic linguist Sir John Morris-Jones published Cerdd Dafod, an in-depth study of the traditional metres of the cynghanedd and a text now seen as the definitive work on the topic. This was brought about after his desire to see a return to traditional poetry and use of strict metre in eistedfoddau. The end of the twentieth century saw a renaissance in cerdd dafod, especially in the metres known as englyn and cywydd, attributed to the poet Alan Llwyd.

Notes

Bibliography

Welsh poetry
Medieval Welsh literature
Welsh-language literature
Western medieval lyric forms
Poetic rhythm